Have You Ever Been in Love is the tenth studio album by recording artist Leo Sayer. It was originally released in November 1983 by Chrysalis (UK), and Warner Bros. (US) as the follow-up to his ninth album World Radio (1982). It was co-produced by the Grammy Award-winning Arif Mardin, in association with Alan Tarney, and Christopher Neil producing the other tracks. Sayer is credited as co-writer on the tracks "Don't Wait Until Tomorrow", and "Orchard Road".

The album reached no.15 on the UK Albums Chart., making it (including the greatest hits compilation album, The Very Best of Leo Sayer) his eleventh successive Top 50 chart entry in the UK Albums Chart, in a period of a little over nine years. The album spawned three singles which first two reached the top sixty on the UK Singles Chart, including "Orchard Road", which would become one of Sayer's most popular songs, this would also become the last Sayer single to make the Top 20, peaking at number 16 and spending nine weeks on the chart.

Track listing

Personnel

Credits are adapted from the album's liner notes.
 Leo Sayer – lead, harmony and background vocals
 Al Hodge – guitar
 Steve Khan – guitar
 Steve Lukather – guitar
 Hank Marvin – guitar
 Derek Austin – synthesizer
 Michael Boddicker – synthesizer
 Bob Christianson – synthesizer
 Ian Lynn – synthesizer
 Alan Tarney – synthesizer, bass guitar, guitar, background vocals
 James Stroud – Synclavier, LinnDrum programming
 Robbie Buchanan – piano
 Geoff Westley – piano
 Mo Foster – bass guitar
 Abraham Laboriel – bass guitar
 Will Lee – bass guitar
 Bob Jenkins – drums
 Jeff Porcaro – drums
 Casey Scheuerell – drums
 Trevor Spencer – drums
 Frank Ricotti – percussion, marimba
 Sharon Campbell – background vocals
 Alan Carvell – background vocals
 Steve George – background vocals
 John Kirby – background vocals
 Marcy Levy – background vocals
 Christopher Neil – background vocals
 Gordon Neville – background vocals
 Richard Page – background vocals
 Jackie Rawe – background vocals

Production
Producers: Arif Mardin, Alan Tarney, Christopher Neil

Charts

References

External links
 
 

1983 albums
Albums produced by Arif Mardin
Albums produced by Christopher Neil
Chrysalis Records albums
Leo Sayer albums
Warner Records albums